Acanthobothrium dasi is a species of parasitic onchobothriid tapeworms first found in the whiptail stingray, Dasyatis brevis, in the Gulf of California. It is relatively small, possesses few segments, relatively few testes, and shows asymmetrical ovaries. It also differs from its cogenerate species by its hook size and length of its hook prongs; cirrus sac size; the position of its genital pore, the number of testes columns that are anterior to the cirrus sac; as well as a number of postvaginal testes.

References

Further reading
Reyda, Florian B., and Janine N. Caira. "Five new species of Acanthobothrium (Cestoda: Tetraphyllidea) from Himantura uarnacoides (Myliobatiformes: Dasyatidae) in Malaysian Borneo." Comparative Parasitology 73.1 (2006): 49–71.
Maleki, Loghman, Masoumeh Malek, and Harry W. Palm. "Two new species of Acanthobothrium (Tetraphyllidea: Onchobothriidae) from Pastinachus cf. sephen (Myliobatiformes: Dasyatidae) from the Persian Gulf and Gulf of Oman." Folia parasitologica 60.5 (2013): 448–456.
List, Host-Parasite, and Parasite-Host List. "Bibliography database of living/fossil sharks, rays and chimaeras (Chondrichthyes: Elasmobranchii, Holocephali)."

External links

WORMS

Cestoda